Paulina de la Mora is a fictional character in the Netflix television series The House of Flowers, appearing in every episode and portrayed by Mexican actress Cecilia Suárez. The eldest daughter of the de la Mora family, she manages both her parents' businesses, a floristry shop and cabaret; being the eldest by several years, she also takes care of her siblings. She was once married to José María Riquelme before she transitioned, but reunites with the now María José after her father, Ernesto, is arrested. The couple have a teenage son, Bruno, and wed again in the series finale. The other main story for Paulina is learning about her biological father, after she finds out in season one that her parents married when her mother, Virginia, was already pregnant.

The character is notable for her distinctive style of speech and near-universal acclaim. Her statement fashion has also been prominently discussed. Suárez has received two Best Actress Platino Awards for the role. She became the lead in season two after the departure of Verónica Castro as Virginia.

Vogue España described Paulina as the best TV character of 2018, saying that Suárez's acting is the best they have seen in a long time, and that she will go down in television history. The character is described as a Mexican pop icon.

Development
Cecilia Suárez, who plays Paulina de la Mora, is a frequent collaborator with the show's creator, Manolo Caro, and had acted in all but one of his previous projects. Paulina is a main character, but in season one was second to the central character of Virginia, portrayed by Verónica Castro. Castro left before the show was renewed, and has given conflicting explanations as to why. For the second season, reviewers saw that "the closest thing the [show] has to a central character now" was Paulina, who steps up to take control of things and who was already a fan favorite; Rodrigo Munizaga speculated that Castro could have felt "overshadowed" by Suárez in the first season. In August 2018, El País described Paulina as a "heart stealer" and, in 2019, Vogue wrote that Suárez was "the new queen of the telenovela" because of the role.

Suárez was injured in the 2017 Puebla earthquake, which happened during filming; production was halted but she could not return to set for a month after production resumed. Though the character became very popular among fans, Suárez has dismissed claims that Paulina may have a spin-off, saying that she does not think Caro would do that, and that the character belongs in the story of the show.

Characterization

Caro has said that he thought Paulina would be "polarizing" when he wrote her, that people would either love her or hate her, not expecting her to be as popular as she was received; for this reason he quickly wrote Suárez a very different role in their 2018 film Perfect Strangers, so both creator and actress could have some mental space from the character in case she was disliked. The character is said to have "a personality that justifies going from drama to involuntary comedy", which has been assessed as a perfect fit for the style of the show. The concept of second chances is the "backbone" of Paulina's character, according to Suárez, who said that Caro concerned himself with this concept through the first two seasons.

Suárez describes Paulina as very loyal, being supportive of her family even when they are hit by scandals and their image ruined. Capelo writes that "Paulina is the classic daddy's girl who grows up in a patrician family", but also acts as the bearer of woes and is there to help them deal with social appearance issues. Cobb says that the character is the "ever-loyal daughter" and a "standout tyrant" in the sense that she goes to extreme lengths to defend her family, "and she never even smudges her flawless red lipstick while she's doing it."

Paulina is bisexual and a feminist. Garrán writes that Paulina "appears conservative but enjoys forming bonds with drag queens and prisoners", an attribute that Suárez compares against the "contradiction" of the conservative Mexico that refuses to accept its transgressive side yet still has Juan Gabriel as one of its most beloved figures. Suárez notes that Paulina is a modern character who, despite her background, does not discriminate against people no matter their skin color, sexuality, or social class – according to fan messages, this is a main reason why people connect with and like her. Ramírez for El País compared Paulina to characters like Elle Woods, Cher Horowitz, and Hilary Banks, though Paulina starts off much different to other 'heiresses' in that her character is based more in "sarcasm, intelligence, the spirit of self-improvement and progressive thinking" and not in the stereotypical portrayal of the daddy's girl.

Voice

The character is known for her distinctive voice, which Marie Claire described as "deliberate, almost stuttery, and a little nasal". Paco León, who plays Paulina's partner, trans woman María José Riquelme, said that when he arrived on set in Mexico after filming had begun and heard Suárez speak in character as Paulina for the first time, he initially thought the cast was playing a prank on him.

Suárez has discussed Paulina's voice. She said that it was hard for her to develop her character's identity, trying out different voices alone before filming and not finding the right fit. The distinctive voice she is known for was improvisation Suárez tried during filming, on the fourth shoot day during the scene where Paulina and Bruno are covering up Roberta's wake at the funeral home. Caro approved of the voice and pushed Suárez to keep exaggerating it further after they decided together to use it. Some of the early scenes had to have the sound re-recorded to keep Paulina's speech consistent. Suárez has hinted that she and Caro devised a backstory for Paulina's voice between themselves, adding that they have some friends who do speak similarly and so using it is "a way to honor them".

The character's languorous speech pattern, which is often slowed down even further to enunciate syllable by syllable, became popular among viewers, spawning the '#PaulinaDeLaMoraChallenge' on social media. In the challenge, fans upload videos where they imitate Paulina's voice, often with some of the character's lines. The challenge was started by Mexican actor Roberto Carlo, with the stars of Cable Girls being the first to take it up. When Netflix and Suárez responded with their own version of the challenge on Twitter, it became a trending event on the website, based on popularity and coverage; at this point, there were over 69,000 fan videos of the challenge. The response to the challenge is one of the only times that Suárez has spoken in Paulina's voice outside of the show. She initially said Netflix restricted her from using the voice, but clarified this as being "a suggestion" that she follows to not break the magic of the fiction. Scholar Paul Julian Smith has noted that videos of Paulina's memorable lines recorded from the show have been uploaded to the Internet by fans and received hundreds of thousands of views.

Several media outlets, including the BBC, have suggested that Paulina's slow speech is a result of regularly taking the anti-anxiety medication Tafil (known in the United States as Xanax) because of an episode where the character says that she is addicted to it. Slow speech is a side effect of the drug. However, the article noted that the character's voice and Tafil use are creatively coincidental as they were conceived of separately during the show's development.

In terms of characterization, Verónica Calderón of Vogue writes that Paulina's voice is demarcating of the fresa ('yuppie', 'posh') stereotype that her character plays with. She says that similar types of speech are not unusual in upper-class neighborhoods like Las Lomas, suggesting that it could be used as part of the show's socioeconomic commentary. Clarín's Pablo Raimondi said that the style of diction establishes her as a "daddy's girl" and a character who can know everyone's secrets because it is a stamp of such characterization.

Paulina's voice became the focus of the show's marketing for season two, in a series of videos. The first marketing videos for season two were released in August 2019: on August 8, a video of Paulina leaving a threatening voicemail for the character Diego, mimicking the one in Taken, was released, which was followed on August 12 with a video showing a voice note left in the siblings' WhatsApp chat by Paulina about their mother's funeral. On October 2, another marketing video, also focused on Paulina speaking, was released. In it, the character makes an ASMR video recap of the show.

Fashion
Alondra Piedra of Wapa wrote that Paulina is also known for her fashion, which she describes as fabulous, and Fernanda Pérez Sánchez of Vogue said that she is "a benchmark of absolute style" and a "fashion icon". Mexican stylist Natalia Seligson was the show's costume designer; she "wanted to bet on fresh and elegant designs with a formal but modern style", which Trendencias says "perfectly embodies Paulina".

Trendencias analyzed Paulina's fashion, noting that it was suitable for the business world but still highly fashionable, showing Paulina to be a busy working woman who is still concerned about appearances, also saying she has a more European style. They said that Paulina's fashion had an impact on viewers and that she first stole the show in episode one because of her unusual pink outfit. Pérez Sánchez discussed this outfit, how Paulina was introduced and showing that she had style straight away. The outfit is a loose blouse and palazzo pants in a monochrome pink that is bold in color and for the event, as women may not often wear pants to a formal garden party.

The Trendencias review noted that a lot of Paulina's outfits are more the style of a working woman, in plain and neutral colors and with many blazers. She also has more couture outfits in different colors, but these are made from a few versatile pieces combined in different ways. Trendencias added that while her clothes are loose, they have a feminine cut, and that she wears flat shoes on all but one occasion. Ramírez agreed that Paulina has a professional and easy wardrobe, and said that it was "minimalist" but that there is a focus on her well-placed accessories, with Pérez Sánchez noticing that when Paulina dressed in blouses and shirts, they were always buttoned all the way up, which she sees as a personal mark of Paulina in the outfits. Noting that Paulina's wardrobe is minimal and sophisticated, Piedra looked at certain outfits and trends; she reported that Paulina often wore pants that start at the waist, something that "stylizes the figure", and a versatile selection of sweaters and blazers. Elsa López of Glamour opined that Paulina's outfits stand out more because of the simplicity, and that her simple and minimalistic taste "perfectly reflects her personality" in that it is to-the-point as well as bold where she is not scared to express herself.

Juanra López of El Confidencial also reported on Paulina's style, noting that she wears her hair in a functional low bun most of the time, and that her make-up is minimal and is "not intended to emphasize her sexuality". López wrote that this style is part of her identity as a high-class woman, and also contrasts with the appearance of María José, which is furthered by Paulina's more work-style fashion compared to María José's haute couture. Ramírez also thought that Paulina's outfits make her seem cultured, but elaborated that "her style relaxes in accordance with her character development".

Appearances
In season one, Paulina starts as the family's main organizer, but is taken out of her role at the florist's 'La Casa de las Flores' when her mother, Virginia, realizes that she's been keeping all of her father Ernesto's dirty secrets and helping him to run a side business at a cabaret also called 'La Casa de las Flores'. After Ernesto is arrested, Paulina visits him more than the rest of the family and works the hardest to get him out, despite knowing that he is not her biological father – she is told that her former psychiatrist Dr. Salomón Cohén is her father. She even calls her ex-husband who transitioned to be a woman, María José Riquelme, to be the family lawyer. The two grow close again, especially with the family being more accepting of María José after Paulina's brother Julián comes out as bisexual, and they work together to track down their teenage son Bruno when he goes camping without telling anyone. She is given the final amount of money to pay off her father's debts and free him by Dr. Cohén, but the safe gets robbed. She also agrees to send Bruno to Madrid with María José. The florist's anniversary party, which Virginia did not want to hold without all the family together, goes ahead at the end of the season. Virginia reveals she sold the florist's to bail out Ernesto for the party, then cuts it short and tells Paulina to go after her own family, which she does, intercepting them at the airport and asking to try again.

The second season is set a year later, after Virginia has died of cancer. At Virginia's funeral, depicted in a short film special, Paulina has a breakdown over her death and also snaps at her mother's fake friends and the hypocrites that judged her brother and partner when they each came out; they're all enjoying the funeral like a party. Paulina is living in Madrid with María José, Bruno, and María José's crazy sister Purificación at the start of the second season. When Virginia's will is challenged, she returns to Mexico to whip her family back in order. She also vows revenge on the family accountant and Julián's partner, Diego, who she suspects stole the money from the safe. To honor her mother's memory, she wants to buy back the florist's, and plans to do this by making the cabaret successful again. She also meets a Catalan man called Alejo, who was a friend to Virginia when she was dying and claims she asked him to check on her children; she has an affair with him. At the cabaret, she organizes with Julián's escort friends to open back rooms for prostitution to raise money more quickly. She then reports this, hoping to get Diego arrested; after emotional conversations with María José, and realizing that Diego may have been a good friend to Virginia during her last days while Alejo is the one who challenged the will, she hands herself in to the police.

Season three begins at the moment season two ended, showing Paulina being taken to her prison cell. In prison, she meets a woman called Chiva, who claims to know more about her family's dark history. As an upper-class woman in for white-collar crime, lawyers assure Paulina, María José, and Alejo that she will be quickly released with the right amount of money. Though Purificación tries to thwart this and keep her locked up, María José returns to Mexico to get her out. Paulina get jealous when María José starts dating lawyer Kim, but they can't stay away from each other, especially when Kim turns out to be manipulative and using trans people for demonstrative purposes. Purificación is committed to a hospital because of her delusions, and the couple work out the flaws in their relationship to finally heal. They have been trying to work out who Chiva is, and what tragedies happened in the family 40 years ago. They discover the story of Pato, Virginia's best friend who was going to testify in support of Chiva, but was murdered for being gay. Ernesto tells Paulina that Pato was her real father. They manage to get Chiva out of jail, and she warns them about their dictatorial grandmother Victoria, who has moved back in. Victoria, who turns dangerously vengeful when she does not get her way, is trying to murder family maid Delia when they arrive at the house, but she is accidentally pushed down the stairs by Delia – Paulina asks the local police, with whom she's friendly, to not question the accident. On the way to the station, she proposes to María José, who accepts. In the series finale, the couple have their wedding, though Purificación does break out to try and kill Paulina, she is stopped by the spirit of Virginia.

Critical response

Cecilia Suárez has been repeatedly singled out and praised for her performance as Paulina. Pavel Gaona suggests that Suárez had to "leave her comfort zone" to play Paulina, and says this was successful. In an otherwise scathing review of the show where he described other characters and performances as "lacking" and "pretentious", Gaona made exception of Suárez and Paulina, giving both high praise.

Some critical reviews have looked at the relationship of the characters of Paulina and Virginia in relation to the show's drama. Relating to the first season, Cobb says that their characterization and the melodrama work well together. After Virginia dies between seasons 1 and 2, Esparza wrote that this was a mistake, explaining that the show's dynamic was best when Virginia and Paulina could play off each other.

Despite the more negative critical response to season two overall, reviews were still mostly positive towards Paulina. Relating to the season being seen as worse than the first, Carlos writes that it is "saved by the character of Paulina". Esparza says that many of the characters became more like caricatures, "except for Cecilia Suárez, Paco de León and also Norma Angélica". Zurro, who had a bad view of all aspects of the season, added that "of course, Paulina de la Mora is still there, and she and Cecilia Suárez are still the rulers of the series". Opposing these, Munizaga criticized the character, saying that Paulina's motivations in the season are "absurd", though noting that the other characters' are worse.

The third season was very positively received, and Paulina and Suárez continued to receive praise. Puentes wrote that no matter what "Paulina continues to not disappoint", with Vargas saying that "Paulina (Cecilia Suárez, always brilliant) stands out like a band leader while some [like her siblings] do not". At the start of the final season, when Paulina is in prison, Puentes specifically commends the portrayal, writing that "Paulina continues to be Paulina despite not wearing divine outfits or regularly going to a stylist".

Though popular with the public, some critics have mixed views on Paulina's voice. Vinícius Nader of Correio Braziliense wrote that it is "very forced and [has an] artificial rhythm", not finding it pleasant, but Manuel Betancourt of Remezcla described it as "deliciously languid", seeing it as a starring feature of her character.

Awards
Cecilia Suárez co-hosted the 2019 Platino Awards, the main international film and television awards for Ibero-American media. Here, the show was nominated in two categories. Suárez was nominated as Best Actress in a Miniseries or TV Series for the role of Paulina, which she won. She won the same award in 2020.

Notes

References

Sources

Comedy television characters
Drama television characters
Female characters in television
Adoptee characters in television
Fictional bisexual females
Fictional characters from Mexico City
Fictional criminals in soap operas
Fictional drug addicts
Fictional female businesspeople
Fictional feminists and women's rights activists
Fictional LGBT characters in television
Fictional prisoners and detainees
Fictional salespeople
Fictional socialites
Fictional white-collar criminals
Telenovela characters
Television characters introduced in 2018
The House of Flowers (TV series)